Albert Flynn DeSilver is an American poet, memoirist, novelist, meditation teacher, speaker, and workshop leader.  He received a BFA in photography from the University of Colorado in 1991 and an MFA in New Genres from the San Francisco Art Institute in 1995. DeSilver served as Marin County California's very first Poet Laureate from 2008 to 2010. His work has appeared in more than one hundred literary journals worldwide including ZYZZYVA, New American Writing, Hanging Loose, Jubilat, Exquisite Corpse, Jacket (Australia), Poetry Kanto (Japan), Van Gogh’s Ear (France), and many others. DeSilver has taught for many years in the Teen and Family Program at Spirit Rock Meditation Center.  He is the author of several books of poems and the memoir Beamish Boy, (2012) which Kirkus Reviews called "a beautifully written memoir, poignant and inspirational".

DeSilver is the founder of Brilliant Writer, LLC, and the Mindful Authors Accelerator, an online educational program that provides an educational platform for creative writers—including a digital learning platform, live events, and online course modules.

DeSilver is also the author of Writing as a Path to Awakening: A Year to Becoming an Excellent Writer & Living an Awakened Life (Sounds True, 2017) which is based on his popular writing workshops by the same name. DeSilver teaches writing and mindfulness workshops at The Omega Institute, The Esalen Institute, Spirit Rock Meditation Center and literary conferences nationally. DeSilver has presented and taught with bestselling authors Cheryl Strayed, Elizabeth Gilbert, Maxine Hong Kingston, U.S. Poet Laureate Kay Ryan and many others. He lives in Northern California.

Works

Non Fiction

 Beamish Boy, A Memoir (The Owl Press, 2012)
 Writing as a Path to Awakening: A Year to Becoming an Excellent Writer & Living an Awakened Life (Sounds True Publishing, 2017)

Poetry

 A Field Guide to the Emotions (Privately Published, 2010)
 Letters to Early Street (La Alameda/University of New Mexico Press, 2007)
 Walking Tooth & Cloud (French Connection Press, Paris, 2007)
 Some Nature (Privately Published, 2004)
 Time Pieces (The Owl Press, 2001)
 Foam Poems (Privately Published, 1998)
 "A Pond" (The Owl Press, 2001) viewed copy of this book

Anthologies
 Cloud View Poets, An Anthology with an introduction by David St. John (Arctos Press, 2009)
 Letters to Poets: Conversations about Poetics, Politics, and Community (Saturnalia Books, 2008)
Sometimes in the Open: Poems from California’s Poets Laureate (Sacramento Poetry Center Press, 2009)
 Featuring poems by Lawrence Ferlinghetti, U.S. Poet Laureate Kay Ryan, Al Young, and Albert Flynn DeSilver among others.
Bay Poetics:  An Anthology of San Francisco Bay Area Poets Edited by Stephanie Young  (Faux Press, Cambridge, MA 2006)

References

External links 
 Official website
 Artist Index
 Goodreads Pre-publication Review of Writing as a Path to Awakening
 Letter Poem Using Personification
 San Francisco Art Institute
 http://www.pw.org/content/poetry_beginning_twelve_poets_who_got_things_going_2007
 http://www.pw.org/content/marin_county_poet_laureate_creates_poetry_chair_literally
 https://www.marinij.com/2012/10/09/woodacre-poet-albert-flynn-desilver-pens-raw-memoir-of-his-troubled-past/

1968 births
Living people
American male poets
Writers from Norwalk, Connecticut
Poets from California
21st-century American poets
21st-century American male writers
Municipal Poets Laureate in the United States